Cistelopsis is a genus of comb-clawed beetles in the family Tenebrionidae. They are found in the Palearctic and Indomalaya.

References

Tenebrionoidea